Lieutenant Harold Koch Boysen was a World War I flying ace credited with five aerial victories.

Boysen joined the Royal Flying Corps in June 1917. After training, he was assigned to 66 Squadron to fly a Sopwith Pup. He would not have any success until the unit re-equipped with Sopwith Camels and transferred fronts from France to northern Italy. He scored a victory in December 1917. In January 1918, he crashed while landing in a fog, and was injured. Upon recovery, he then scored four more times in May 1918, including one win shared with Lieutenant Christopher McEvoy.

See also
 List of World War I flying aces from the United States

References
 American Aces of World War I. Norman Franks, Harry Dempsey. Osprey Publishing, 2001. , .

1891 births
1963 deaths
American World War I flying aces
Aviators from Minnesota
People from Lincoln County, Minnesota